Shomie Ranjan Das (born 28 August 1935) is an Indian educationist. An alumnus of The Doon School, he has served as the headmaster of the three most top schools of India, namely The Doon School, Mayo College and Lawrence School, Sanawar. He had earlier taught in Gordonstoun School in Scotland. He established the Oakridge International School in Hyderabad, Visakhapatnam, Mohali, and Bengaluru.

Career
After his earlier education at The Doon School, he graduated from St. Xavier's College, of the University of Calcutta and the University of Cambridge. After working at Gordonstoun School, where he taught Prince Charles he was principal of Mayo College from 1969 to 1974. He then became headmaster of the Lawrence School, Sanawar in 1974 and held this position until 1988.

He served as headmaster of The Doon School from 1988 to 1995. He was succeeded by John Mason. He also served as the Principal of the renowned and famed Mayo College where he is revered as one of the greatest principals of all time, second only to Mr. JTM Gibson, O.B.E, Padma Shri. 
After he retired from the Doon School, he became an educational consultant and he has been contributing his vision in education to nearly 76 schools. all over the country. He is also instrumental in setting Adamas International School at Kolkata, which is near Dunlop (Rathtala). He is currently the Chairman of Oakridge International School.

Other
He is a grandson of Satish Ranjan Das, an Indian Barrister and social reformer.

References

External links
Profile by Adamas International School

The Doon School alumni
Headmasters of The Doon School
1935 births
Living people
20th-century Indian educational theorists
Das, Satish Ranjan
University of Calcutta alumni